Sam Trammell (born January 29, 1969) is an American actor, known for his role as Sam Merlotte on the HBO fantasy drama series True Blood. He was nominated for the Tony Award for Best Featured Actor in a Play for his performance as Richard Miller in Ah, Wilderness!

Career
Trammell has worked in theater, Broadway, Off-Broadway, film, and television. His stage credits include a Tony Award-nominated performance in Ah, Wilderness! at Lincoln Center. Off-Broadway, he starred in Dealer's Choice, My Night with Reg, If Memory Serves, and Ancestral Voices, as well as in Kit Marlowe at the Joseph Papp Public Theater.

Trammell's big break came when he landed the role of Sam Merlotte on the HBO series True Blood. In 2013, he played Darrell Mackey in the drama film White Rabbit. He played Hazel (Shailene Woodley)'s father, Michael Lancaster, in the 2014 film The Fault in Our Stars, based on the novel of the same name by John Green.

In 2019, Trammell starred in the Netflix horror-drama series, The Order.

Personal life
Trammell was born in New Orleans, Louisiana, and was raised in Charleston, West Virginia. He attended Brown University, graduating in 1991.

Trammell met actress Missy Yager in 2003 while performing theatre in New York City. The couple's twin sons were born in August 2011.

Awards
For his work on HBO's True Blood, Trammell was nominated for:
Breakout Performance – Male at the 2009 Scream Awards
 Best Supporting Actor at the 2010 Scream Awards. 
Outstanding Performance by an Ensemble in a Drama Series at the 16th Annual Screen Actors Guild Awards

Filmography

References

External links
 
 
 

1969 births
Living people
20th-century American male actors
21st-century American male actors
American male film actors
American male stage actors
American male television actors
Brown University alumni
George Washington High School (Charleston, West Virginia) alumni
Male actors from New Orleans
Male actors from West Virginia
Actors from Charleston, West Virginia
Theatre World Award winners
University of Paris alumni